Sir Henry Colley  was an Irish politician.

Colley was educated at  Trinity College, Dublin.

Colley represented Monaghan Borough from 1613 until 1615.

References

17th-century Irish politicians
Irish MPs 1613–1615
Members of the Parliament of Ireland (pre-1801) for County Monaghan constituencies
Alumni of Trinity College Dublin